Janice Moore Fuller (born 1951) is an American poet and playwright, currently Writer-In-Residence and Professor of English at Catawba College, in Salisbury, NC. She is the author of three books of poetry and a number of plays (see bibliography). Fuller earned her B.A. at Duke University and her M.A. and Ph.D at the University of North Carolina at Greensboro.  An outstanding instructor, she is a four-time winner of Catawba's Teacher of the Year Award; she has also won the Swink Prize for Outstanding Classroom Teaching.  She has been Visiting Professor of English at Harlaxton College (the British campus of the University of Evansville), and a poetry workshop teacher at the Wildacres Writers Workshop.

Bibliography 

Poetry
Seance.  Knoxville: Iris P, 2007.  
Sex Education. Knoxville: Iris P, 2004.  
Archeology Is a Destructive Science.  Carthage, NC: Scots Plaid P, 1998. 

Plays
Dix, a full-length play. Produced at the Minneapolis Fringe Festival. August 2004.
Church of the Spilled Blood, a one-act play. Produced at Bare Bones Theater’s New Play Festival, Charlotte, NC. May 2003.
The Last Glass-Bottom Boat, a series of three short plays. Produced at Catawba College’s Florence Busby Corriher Theater, March 2003.
Conjoined, a full-length one-act play. Staged reading at Catawba College’s Florence Busby Corriher Theater, November 2002.

References

Poets from North Carolina
1951 births
Living people
Duke University alumni
University of North Carolina at Greensboro alumni
Catawba College faculty
American women poets
20th-century American poets
20th-century American women writers
American women academics
21st-century American women